Xilin may refer to:
Xilin (mythology) or qilin, a mythical creature of ancient China
Xilin District, a district in Yichun, Heilongjiang, China
Xilin County, a county in Guangxi, China
Xilin Gol League, a prefecture-level division of Inner Mongolia, China
Xilin River, a river in Inner Mongolia, China
Xilin MRT station, an upcoming Mass Rapid Transit station on the Downtown MRT line in Singapore

See also
 Kirin (disambiguation)
 Kylin (disambiguation)
 Qilin (disambiguation)
 Xiling (disambiguation)